Sonia Elizabeth Reamsbottom (born 28 March 1962 in Kildare) is an Irish cricketer. She was a right-handed wicket-keeper batsman.

References

1962 births
Living people
Irish women cricketers
Ireland women One Day International cricketers
People from Kildare (town)
Irish women cricket captains
Wicket-keepers
Sportspeople from County Kildare